Thelymitra xanthotricha, commonly called the yellow tufted sun orchid or yellow tufted slender sun orchid, is a species of orchid in the family Orchidaceae and endemic to the south-west of Western Australia. It has a single erect, fleshy, channelled, dark green leaf and up to six relatively large dark blue to purplish flowers.

Description
The lobe on the top of the anther is dark brown with a yellow tip, tube-shaped and inflated with a notched end. The side lobes curve gently upwards and have toothbrush-like tufts of creamy yellow hairs. The flowers are self-pollinating and open only slowly, even on hot days. Flowering occurs in September and October.

Taxonomy and naming
Thelymitra xanthotricha was first formally described in 2004 by Jeff Jeanes and the description was published in Muelleria. The specific epithet (xanthotricha) means "yellow hair".

Distribution and habitat
The yellow tufted sun orchid grows with shrubs and sedges and is found between Perth and Brookton and between Esperance and Condingup.

Conservation
Thelymitra xanthotricha is classified as "not threatened" by the Western Australian Government Department of Parks and Wildlife.

References

External links

xanthotricha
Endemic orchids of Australia
Orchids of Western Australia
Plants described in 2004